Mount Maunganui is a major residential, commercial and industrial suburb of the Tauranga metropolitan area, located on a peninsula to the north-east of Tauranga's city centre. It was an independent town from Tauranga until the completion of the Tauranga Harbour Bridge in 1988, which connects Mount Maunganui to Tauranga's central business district.

Mount Maunganui is also the name of the large lava dome which was formed by the upwelling of rhyolite lava about two to three million years ago. It is officially known by its Māori name Mauao, but is colloquially known in New Zealand simply as The Mount.

The New Zealand Ministry for Culture and Heritage gives a translation of "large mountain" for Maunganui.

Geography
Mount Maunganui is located atop a sand bar that connects Mauao to the mainland, a geographical formation known as a tombolo. Because of this formation, the residents of Mount Maunganui have both a harbour beach (Pilot Bay) and an ocean beach with great surf, within a short distance.  At the base of Mauao, the distance between the harbour and ocean side is a couple of blocks.

The ocean beach has Mauao or Mount Maunganui at its western end, and a man made land bridge connecting Moturiki Island at its eastern end.

Adjacent to Mount Maunganui on its south-eastern edge (from Sandhurst Drive onwards) is Papamoa Beach, another very large suburb of Tauranga. Papamoa Beach has a slightly larger population than Mount Maunganui, but doesn't have as many businesses as Mount Maunganui. Both suburbs are distinctly geographically separate from the rest of Tauranga by the Tauranga Harbour; two bridges (SH2 and SH29) and the winding Welcome Bay Road are the only connections by land to the central business district.

Mauao (The Mount) is a large lava dome which rises above the town. According to Maori legend, this hill was a pononga [slave] to a mountain called Otanewainuku. It was formerly a Māori pā, and the remains of trenches can be seen in the ridges, as well as ancient shell middens. Today, it is open to the public year-round, and is a popular place to either walk around, or climb up. From the summit, a good stretch of coastline can be seen in either direction, as well as the Kaimai Range to the west.

Demographics

Mount Maunganui had a population of 6,510 at the 2018 New Zealand census, an increase of 696 people (12.0%) since the 2013 census, and an increase of 1,176 people (22.0%) since the 2006 census. There were 2,724 households, comprising 3,264 males and 3,249 females, giving a sex ratio of 1.0 males per female, with 918 people (14.1%) aged under 15 years, 1,332 (20.5%) aged 15 to 29, 3,153 (48.4%) aged 30 to 64, and 1,101 (16.9%) aged 65 or older.

Ethnicities were 90.2% European/Pākehā, 13.3% Māori, 1.4% Pacific peoples, 3.2% Asian, and 3.3% other ethnicities. People may identify with more than one ethnicity.

The percentage of people born overseas was 20.6, compared with 27.1% nationally.

Although some people chose not to answer the census's question about religious affiliation, 58.8% had no religion, 32.1% were Christian, 0.7% had Māori religious beliefs, 0.6% were Hindu, 0.6% were Buddhist and 1.8% had other religions.

Of those at least 15 years old, 1,584 (28.3%) people had a bachelor's or higher degree, and 675 (12.1%) people had no formal qualifications. 1,449 people (25.9%) earned over $70,000 compared to 17.2% nationally. The employment status of those at least 15 was that 3,090 (55.3%) people were employed full-time, 837 (15.0%) were part-time, and 141 (2.5%) were unemployed.

Politics

Over the years, Mount Maunganui had suffered a number of attempts to amalgamate it with Tauranga but had fought  effectively to remain independent until the 1989 local government reforms.

During 1974,Bob Owens was Mayor of both Mount Maunganui and Tauranga, a unique situation in the annals of local government in New Zealand. Mr Owens made no secret of the fact that he favoured the joining of the two municipalities. The election of 1974 was fought on this issue and Owens was defeated in the polls in Mount Maunganui with a landslide victory to Mr L. Kelvin O'Hara, the youngest person elected to the position of Mayor in New Zealand, who challenged him on the issue, and other environmental issues with the catch cry "why share a mayor?"

It remains controversial in Mount Maunganui whether the transition from an independently administered unit of local government to a minor part of the Tauranga City Council over 20 years ago was beneficial.

Some Mount Maunganui residents are still of the opinion Tauranga and Mount Maunganui are separate towns, even though they officially amalgamated in 1989. Simon Bridges, the local Member of Parliament for the area, described it in Parliament in 2012 "I have to say that there still is, though—and I have found this when first standing for Parliament—a sense of the "Mounties" and of those who are city-side, and that is still present to some extent."

History

Mount Maunganui was known colloquially as Maunganui until 1907; during the application process to formally name the area when the first subdivision of land was carried out, Maunganui was dismissed as being too similar to several other towns' names.  One of the early settlers, J.C. Adams, then suggested three alternative names, which were Te Maire, Tamure (the Māori name for Snapper), and Rakataura, with the latter name selected by the Survey Department. The official name Rakataura never came into common use, as Maunganui had long been the unofficial name of the area. The name Mount Maunganui originated as a rebranding by early developers, who succeeded in changing the official name of the town from Rakataura. The current name is an example of a tautological place name, maunga being a Māori term for mountain (nui means "big").

Mount Maunganui fought fiercely and successfully during the 1950s to retain independence from Tauranga, then failed with the completion of the harbour bridge in 1988.

The former Mount Maunganui Borough Council set records in New Zealand as having never had a deficit in its history, something which Tauranga City Council has never achieved. Critics say the town was built by leveraging the commercial and industrial ratepayers, but Mount Maunganui was a forerunner in some areas and applied the user pays philosophy before it was common in New Zealand.

The original house of early settler J.C. Adams, the first home built at Mount Maunganui, still stands at 4 Adams Avenue. The 1906 house is registered with Heritage New Zealand as a Category II historic building.

The local Whareroa Marae and Rauru ki Tahi meeting house is a meeting place for the Ngāi Te Rangi hapū of Ngāti Kuku and Ngāi Tukairangi.

Character 

Mount Maunganui is regarded by many to be a coastal resort town, although Port of Tauranga, a major facility, is also partly located on the western (harbour) side. It is also well known for the quality of its surfing conditions, though parts of the beach are notoriously dangerous. The harbour bridge was opened in 1988, linking Mount Maunganui with Tauranga. The construction of a duplication bridge was completed in December 2009, forming a vital link in Tauranga and Mount Maunganui's growing motorway system.

A large container terminal and overseas wharf is located at Mount Maunganui. A branch railway from the East Coast Main Trunk railway runs between the Te Maunga and northern parts of the suburb.

Mount Maunganui also features the popular Bayfair Shopping Centre. The centre is one of the largest in the North Island outside Auckland and Wellington.

Mount Maunganui is a popular New Years destination, with over 20,000 people frequenting the suburb over the New Years period. Many festivities take place on and around the main beach in the north of the suburb.

As part of the Port of Tauranga is located in Mount Maunganui, there are many cruise ship visits annually to the suburb.

Sport 

The suburb is home to the cricket ground Bay Oval, which held the 2018 ICC Under 19 Cricket World Cup final on 3 February 2018 as well as international cricket matches.

Every year Mount Maunganui hosts the Northern Regional Surf Championships (NRC's), and other events such as the NZ Under 14 Ocean Athlete Championships, the Pro Volleyball Tour and The Port of Tauranga Half Ironman triathlon.

Artificial reef 
New Zealand's first artificial reef was installed at the Mount. Construction of the reef was hampered by lack of funds and ironically, too many waves. Initially the public was told the reef would cost about $500k, but costs escalated to $800k. Media reported that local surfers are disappointed with the waves produced by the reef. The reef has also been blamed for creating rips and has now been removed.

Climate
The climate is mild subtropic:

 Summer = 20 °C / 30 °C. ( Jan/Feb )
 Winter = 10 °C / 15 °C.  ( Jun/Jul )
 Frosts Avg/Yr = 12 ( -1 °C −2 °C ).

 Rainfall = 1280mm/Yr.Avg
 Sunshine = Min 2200hrs/Yr.
 Beach Temp avg.
 Summer = 21 °C.
 Winter = 14 °C.

Education

Several schools are located in the suburbs of Omanu and Arataki, including Mount Maunganui College and Mount Maunganui Intermediate.

See also
 Mauao (Mount Maunganui)

References

External links
Mount Maunganui Tourism Website

Maunganui, Mount
Surfing locations in New Zealand
Suburbs of Tauranga
Tombolos
Tourist attractions in the Bay of Plenty Region
Landforms of the Bay of Plenty Region
Populated places in the Bay of Plenty Region
Beaches of the Bay of Plenty Region
Populated places around the Tauranga Harbour